Carlos G. Duque (born June 13, 1973 in Cali, Colombia) is an actively competing International Federation of Bodybuilding and Fitness professional bodybuilder.

Background 
Carlos was born in Cali, Colombia, and moved to the United States  when he was 19 years old. He currently resides in Atlanta, Georgia. Carlos is currently competing in the IFBB's Men's Physique Bodybuilding Division.

Bodybuilding career 
He entered his first bodybuilding competition, the Arnold Amateur in Columbus, OH in 2012.

Notable amateur regionals and nationals include the National Physique Committee East Coast Championships (2014), NPC Teen Collegiate & Masters National Championships (2015, 2017, 2018, 2019), NPC Coastal USA (2015), NPC Eastern Seaboard Classic (2016),  NPC Charlotte Cup (2016),  NPC Junior Nationals Bodybuilding, Fitness & Figure Championships (2016), and the Olympia Amateur (2017).

After 10 years of focused weight training he was able to achieve professional status by winning the Nspire Sports League (NSL) Atlanta South East Open in 2016.  His first professional appearance was in 2016 when he competed in the NSL Fit Sport World Championships. He then earned his IFBB pro card by placing first in the NPC Teen Collegiate & Masters National Championships professional qualifier in Pittsburgh 2019. His first PRO debut as an IFBB was when he competed in the   IFBB Hurricane Pro competition in 2019.   As of November 2019, his Professional Championship competitions include the Fit Sport World Championships (2016),  IFBB Pro Hurricane (2019), and the IFBB Classic Masters Pro (2019).

Carlos has been featured in many fitness websites including the American fitness and bodybuilding magazine MuscularDevelopment.com  and the National Physique Committee's premier online news command center - NPCnewsonline.com 

He is married and has three children.

Contest history

Professional Championships

Amateur competitions

National

Regional

References

1973 births
Living people
American bodybuilders
Professional bodybuilders